Supercop 2 is a 1993 Hong Kong action film directed by Stanley Tong and starring Michelle Yeoh.  It is a spin-off of Jackie Chan's Police Story film series involving the character Yeoh portrayed in Supercop.

Although Jackie Chan only has a cameo appearance in this film, some DVD covers prominently featured Chan, misleading audiences into thinking he is one of the main characters. He reprises his role as Inspector Chan, but in drag to catch a criminal in drag wearing the same wig and clothes.

Plot
After the mission from Supercop, Inspector Yang participates in neutralizing a terrorist incident during which she narrowly survives, and is awarded the Highest Distinction for the mission. Her boyfriend Chang, a war veteran who works as a security guard and bravely helped Yang in her mission, is frustrated that Yang gets a mere medal for risking her life. Growing disillusioned with the prospects in Mainland China, the ambitious Chang leaves for Hong Kong, promising to one day come back a millionaire and marry Yang.

Some time later, the Hong Kong police encounters a heavily armed gang of highly trained robbers. Suspecting them to be ex-militaries from the Mainland, the police asked for assistance from the Chinese Public Security. Yang is dispatched to Hong Kong to provide intelligence sharing, working with Inspector Lee, who has an awkward crush on Yang.

Yang helps Lee track down the robbers' safehouse. Although the robbers have rigged explosives in the building to ambush the police, Chang, who leads the gang, hesitates after seeing Yang, resulting in one of their member being killed and another arrested. In order to free the arrested man, who is a demolition specialist crucial to an upcoming heist, Chang contacts Yang and rekindles their relationship, and manages to stage a successful breakout. Yang suspects Chang's part in the crime, but cannot bring herself to accuse Chang. She is then ordered to return to Mainland, although she convinces Lee to let her stay on the case.

The robbers then perform a daring heist on the Central Bank, masterminded by Roger Davidson, the designer of the Bank's vault security. After successfully breaking into the vault, Davidson double-crosses Chang's gang. Chang survives the betrayal and chases down Davidson's crew in an underwater subway tunnel, killing Davidson's men and mortally wounding Davidson.  Yang, who has infiltrated the bank during the heist, arrives and confronts Chang, trying to convince him to surrender.  When Chang is distracted by Yang, the dying Davidson detonates a bomb, causing the tunnel to flood. Knowing his injury will only hinder their survival, Chang pushes Yang and Lee past the lock gate, sacrificing his own life for the person he loved.

Cast
 Michelle Yeoh as Interpol Inspector Jessica Yang Jian-wa / Jessica Yang Cien-hua
 Yu Rongguang (as Yu Rong Guang) as David Chang Fung, Vietnam veteran and Yang's ex-boyfriend
 Emil Chau as RHKP Inspector Martin Lee Kwong-ming
 Athena Chu as Annie May Lee, Lee's younger sister
 Louis Fan (as Fan Sui Wong) as Alan Kwok Shao-long, Lee's partner and May's boyfriend
 Bill Tung as "Uncle" Bill Wong, RHKP deputy commissioner
 Alain Guernier as Roger Davidson, designer of the Central Bank Vault
 Bowie Lam as George Ho Chu, Chang's right-hand man
 Dick Wei as Ah Shuen / Chuen
 Joe Cheung as Jewelry shop manager / Fung's Man in Hospital (2 roles)
 Chan Mei-kei as Bank manager
 Yukari Oshima as Red Terrorist at the Beginning 
 Mars as Jewelry Store Customer 
 Alien Sit as Po
 Sam Wong as Chun
 Bruce Law as Ping 
 Jackie Chan as Inspector "Kevin" Chan Ka-Kui (cameo)
 Eric Tsang as Jewel Robbing Leader (cameo)
 Jon M. Chu

Alternative titles
(original title)
Chiu kup gai wak
Argentina
Projecto S
Australia
Project S
Brazil (video title)	
Policial Acima de Tudo
Brazil	
Police Story 3, Parte 2: Policial Acima de Tudo
Canada (French title)	
Chiu kup gai wak
Canada (English title)
Supercop 2
China (Cantonese title) (poster title)	
超級警察2 超級計劃
Denmark (video title)
Once a Cop
Finland	
Once a Cop
France	
Project S
France (video box title)
Supercop 2
Germany
Mega Cop
Greece
Supercop 2
Hong Kong (English title)
Project S
Hong Kong (English title) (series title)
Police Story 3: Supercop 2
Hong Kong (Mandarin title)	
Chao ji ji hua
Hungary
Volt egyszer egy zsaru
Japan (Rōmaji title)	
プロジェクトS
Japan
Purojekuto S
New Zealand (English title)
Project S
Philippines (English title)
Supercop 2
Poland
Policyjna opowieść 4: Projekt S
Romania
Supercop
Russia	
Супер полицейский 2
Slovenia
Projekt S
Spain
Supercop 2
Sweden
Once a Cop
UK
Project S
UK (video box title)	
Project S: Police Story 4
USA
Supercop 2
USA (alternative title)
Once a Cop
International (English title) (alternative title)	
Project S
International (English title)
Supercop 2

Box office
In Hong Kong, the film grossed HK$9,337,853, as of 8 November 1993.

See also
Jackie Chan filmography

External links

1993 films
1993 action thriller films
1993 martial arts films
Police detective films
Cantonese-language films
Hong Kong action thriller films
Hong Kong martial arts films
Kung fu films
Golden Harvest films
Film spin-offs
Films shot in Hong Kong
Films directed by Stanley Tong
Films scored by Michael Wandmacher
Police Story (film series)
1990s police procedural films
1990s Hong Kong films